Operation Sankat Mochan ( lit. crisis redemption) was an operation of the Indian Air Force to evacuate Indian citizens and other foreign nationals from South Sudan during the South Sudanese Civil War. The operation was carried out in view of 2016 Juba clashes.

Background
There were around 600 Indians in South Sudan; around 450 in Juba and others elsewhere in the country.

Operation
Two C-17 Globemasters of the Indian Air Force were deployed to evacuate. The first flight left Juba on 15 July (South Sudan Time) carrying 143 individuals including 10 women and 3 infants. It landed in Thiruvananthapuram, Kerala on 16 July.

References

2016 in military history
Non-combat military operations involving India
2016 in India
2016 in South Sudan
Evacuations of Indians
Airlifts
History of the foreign relations of India
Indian diaspora in Asia
2016 in aviation
2016 in foreign relations of India
Aviation history of India
Modi administration
India–South Sudan relations
South Sudanese Civil War
Operations involving the Indian Air Force
Non-combatant evacuation operations